Marie George (born Clara Marie Georg; 25 June 1876 – 15 July 1955) was an American actress, singer and stage beauty who had a successful career first in New York City and later in London, England during the Edwardian era.

Early life
Marie George was born in New York in 25 June 1876 as Clara Marie Georg to German-American parents. On going on the stage she adopted the Anglisized version of her surname.

Stage career

On moving with her husband to London she played Dolly Twinkle in The Casino Girl at the Shaftesbury Theatre (1900), was in the American musical comedy The Belle of Bohemia at the Apollo Theatre (1901) and played Cornelia in The White Chrysanthemum at the Criterion Theatre (1905). For a number of years she was a regular in the annual pantomime at the Theatre Royal, Drury Lane including: Gretchen in Mother Goose (1902) opposite Dan Leno; Principal Girl in Humpty Dumpty (1903) during which she was taken ill and was replaced by Mabel Love; Cupid in The White Cat (1904));  Ruby in Sinbad (1906); Cissie in Babes in the Wood (1907);  and Katrina in Dick Whittington (1908); and the title role in Aladdin (1909).

George appeared as Poll Merrie in Lady Tatters opposite Courtice Pounds and Walter Passmore at the Shaftesbury Theatre (1907) and played Mariza opposite Passmore in Baron Trenck at the Strand Theatre (1911). In 1912 she played the title role in a British tour of the musical comedy The Boy Scout with C. Hayden Coffin and in 1915 was Mrs. Pineapple in the first revival of A Chinese Honeymoon at the Prince of Wales Theatre.

In July 1911 Marie George was accompanied by Herbert Sparling in a performance at Brighton Palace Pier, where:
‘Marie George gives the audience twenty minutes of sparkling fun, and makes them regret very much the powers that be which prevent her continuing her part for double that period. She is delightful in her songs, “That’s a Cinch,” and “Over again.” She is most ably assisted by Mr. Herbert Sparling, whose make-up as a pianoforte turner and acting throughout is wonderfully clever.’Brighton & Hove Society, Brighton, Sussex, Thursday, 12 July 1911, p. 4482b

Personal life
Marie was married to the American theatrical manager Norman J. Norman. She died in London in 15 July 1955, aged 79.

References

External links
Photographs of Marie George (1879-1955), Actress - National Portrait Gallery, London

1876 births
1975 deaths
People from New York (state)
20th-century American actresses
American stage actresses
American musical theatre actresses
20th-century American singers
20th-century American women singers